The Association of Real Estate License Law Officials (ARELLO), founded in 1930 in Canada, supports regulatory agencies in the administration and enforcement of real estate license (or registration) laws in their respective jurisdictions.

Among its positions, the organization encourages licensure and education recognition between jurisdictions.  In May 2007, the Ontario Real Estate Association cited adherence to ARELLO exam standards as one of its reasons in switching to closed book examinations.

History
 1930 - founded as the National Association of License Law Officials (NALLO)
 1965 - renamed National Association of Real Estate License Law Officials (NARELLO)
 1993 - renamed Association of Real Estate License Law Officials (ARELLO)

External links
 ARELLO
 ARELLO license verification (for participating jurisdictions)
 ARELLO distance education certification
 List of regulatory agencies

References

Real estate industry trade groups based in Canada